The 1978 Campeonato Brasileiro Série A, (officially the IV Copa Brasil) was the 22nd edition of the Campeonato Brasileiro Série A.

Overview
It was contested by 74 teams, and Guarani won the championship.

First phase

Group A

Group B

Group C

Group D

Group E

Group F

Second phase

Group G

Group H

Group I

Group J

Group K

Group L

Group M

Group N

Group O

Group P

Third phase

Group Q

Group R

Group S

Group T

Quarterfinals

First leg

Second leg

Semifinals

First leg

Second leg

Finals

First leg

Second leg

Final standings

Notes

References
 1978 Campeonato Brasileiro Série A at RSSSF

1978
1
Brazil
B